The 1932 Summer Olympics, officially known as the Games of the X Olympiad, was an international multi-sport event held in Los Angeles, California, United States, from July 30 to August 14. 

The 1932 Games had 1,332 athletes from 37 National Olympic Committees (NOCs) participating in a total of 116 events in 14 sports. Athletes from 27 NOCs won medals, of which 19 won at least one gold medal. The 1932 Games featured the first appearance of NOCs from Colombia and the Republic of China.

The most successful NOC at the Games was that representing the host nation, the United States. They won the most gold and total medals, 41 and 103, respectively. The second place NOC, representing Italy, improved significantly compared to the previous Games, winning 36 medals, almost twice as much as in 1928. The Indian Men's Field Hockey team defended their gold medal from the previous Games, a feat they repeated until the 1956 Summer Olympics.

Medal table

The ranking in this table is based on information provided by the International Olympic Committee (IOC) and is consistent with IOC convention in its published medal tables. By default, the table is ordered by the number of gold medals the athletes from a National Olympic Committee have won (a nation is represented at a Games by the associated National Olympic Committee). The number of silver medals is taken into consideration next and then the number of bronze medals. If NOCs are still tied, equal ranking is given and they are listed alphabetically by IOC country code.

References

External links
 
 
 

Medal count
1932